The 2002 Rebellion was the fourth annual and final Rebellion professional wrestling pay-per-view (PPV) event produced by the American promotion, World Wrestling Entertainment (WWE). It was held exclusively for wrestlers from the promotion's SmackDown! brand division, which made it WWE's first-ever SmackDown!-exclusive PPV. The event took place on October 26, 2002, at the Manchester Arena in Manchester, England and was broadcast exclusively in the United Kingdom. It was the first Rebellion held under the WWE name, after the promotion had been renamed from World Wrestling Federation (WWF) to WWE in May earlier that year. Rebellion was discontinued after this 2002 event due to the promotion's discontinuation of UK-exclusive PPVs in 2003.

Production

Background
Rebellion was an annual United Kingdom-exclusive pay-per-view (PPV) produced by the American professional wrestling promotion, World Wrestling Entertainment (WWE), since 1999. The 2002 event was the fourth event in the Rebellion chronology. It was scheduled to be held on October 26, 2002, at the Manchester Arena in Manchester, England. It was also the first Rebellion produced under the WWE name, as the company was renamed from World Wrestling Federation (WWF) to WWE in May earlier that year. It was also the first Rebellion produced under the brand extension that was introduced in March, which divided the roster into two separate brands, Raw and SmackDown!, where wrestlers were exclusively assigned to perform. The 2002 event was in turn held exclusively for wrestlers from the SmackDown! brand, which was the promotion's first SmackDown!-exclusive PPV produced.

Storylines
The event featured nine professional wrestling matches and two pre-show matches that involved different wrestlers from pre-existing scripted feuds and storylines, where wrestlers portrayed villains, heroes, or less distinguishable characters in the scripted events that built tension and culminated in a wrestling match or series of matches, with results predetermined by WWE's writers on the SmackDown! brand. Storylines were produced on WWE's weekly television show SmackDown!.

Event

Prior to the start of the pay-per-view, Bill DeMott defeated Shannon Moore in a dark match.

Preliminary matches
The first match of the pay-per-view was scheduled to be The Undertaker taking on Matt Hardy; However, Booker T substituted for The Undertaker during the match. The match ended when Matt Hardy went for the Twist of Fate, but Booker T reversed it and hit the scissor kick for the win. Following the match, Booker T grabbed the mic and said he knows what everyone is there to see, and did the Spinnarooni before leaving the ring.

The second match was a mixed tag team match which saw John Cena and Dawn Marie take on Billy Kidman and Torrie Wilson. Kidman and Wilson got the win after Kidman hit the Shooting Star Press off the top on Cena.

The next match saw Shoichi Funaki defeat Crash Holly. When Holly went for the Oklahoma Side Roll, Funaki blocked it and rolled him up for the victory.

An elimination triple threat match for the Cruiserweight Championship was next. This match saw Jamie Noble defend his title against Rey Mysterio and Tajiri. Noble first eliminated Tajiri after hitting the Tiger Bomb. When Mysterio went for a victory roll, Noble grabbed Nidia outside the ring, and pinned Mysterio to retain the title. After the match, Mysterio attacked Noble knocking both him and Nidia down, followed by Mysterio hitting the 619 on both of them.

The next match saw Reverend D-Von and Ron Simmons defeat Chuck Palumbo and The Big Valbowski (subbing for Billy Gunn).

A Kiss My Ass match was next. After Albert hit an exposed turnbuckle, Rikishi hit a Bonzi Drop on Albert and picked up the pinfall victory. After the match, Albert refused to kiss Rikishi's ass, resulting in the referee threatening to suspend Albert if he did not. Although Albert attempted to hit Rikishi with a low blow, Rikishi regained control and hit the Stink Face on Albert. Following the match, Tazz, Michael Cole and Tony Chimel rejoined Rikishi in the ring to dance.

The penultimate match was a WWE Tag Team Championship match. This match saw Chris Benoit and Kurt Angle defending their titles against Los Guerreros (Eddie Guerrero and Chavo Guerrero). After Benoit threw Eddie throat first onto the top rope, Angle hit Eddie with the Olympic Slam for the victory.

Main event match
The main event was a handicap match for the WWE Championship. The match saw the champion Brock Lesnar team up with Paul Heyman to take on Edge. When Edge attempted to come off the top rope, he was hit in the midsection by Lesnar with a chair followed by a F-5, for the victory. After the match, Heyman began screaming and bragging in Edge's face, to which Edge kicked a chair into Heyman's face and then hit him with a DDT.

Aftermath
The 2002 Rebellion would be the final Rebellion event, as WWE discontinued UK-exclusive PPVs after the 2003 Insurrextion PPV as the company began to broadcast Raw and SmackDown! from the UK in 2004.

Results

See also

Professional wrestling in the United Kingdom

References

Professional wrestling in England
2002 in England
Events in Manchester
October 2002 events in the United Kingdom
2002 WWE pay-per-view events
WWE Rebellion
WWE SmackDown